Dorsal is an underground metro station on the Line 2 of the Santiago Metro, in Santiago, Chile. Along with Vespucio Norte and Zapadores, it was opened on 21 December 2006 Christmas Eve as part of a subway expansion master plan.

References

Santiago Metro stations
Railway stations opened in 2006
Santiago Metro Line 2